Moe Fu Kiat (born 1926) is a Malaysian former sports shooter. He competed in the trap event at the 1956 Summer Olympics.

References

External links
 

1926 births
Possibly living people
Malaysian male sport shooters
Olympic shooters of Malaya
Shooters at the 1956 Summer Olympics
Place of birth missing (living people)